Chen Yin is a Chinese television program host on CCTV.

Early life
Chen Yin attended Cornell University, where she majored in Economics with concentration in international relations and East Asian studies.

Career
Yin Chen started her Travelogue career in 2005. She went on to feature in various Travelogue specials, including "Street Special," where she went to Xitang in Zhejiang among other places; "History Special," where she went to Jingdezhen among other sites, "Ethnic Odyssey" where she went to Yunnan and Guizhou among other sites and "Being Beijing," where she explored Southern Beijing and the traditional hutongs near Shichahai. After a successful period, she went on to conduct fellow CCTV show, Culture Express.

References

External links
Official site
Yin's Travelogue site
Yin's Culture Express site

Year of birth missing (living people)
Living people
Chinese television presenters
Chinese women television presenters
Cornell University alumni